Knut Brogaard (26 February 1935 – 10 May 2004) was a Norwegian footballer. He played in one match for the Norway national football team in 1954.

References

External links
 
 

1935 births
2004 deaths
Norwegian footballers
Norway international footballers
Place of birth missing
Association football defenders
FK Ørn-Horten players